Moukhtara   is a small town in the Chouf District of the Mount Lebanon Governorate of Lebanon.  The town's inhabitants are divided between Druze and Christians. It is the hometown of Walid Jumblatt, the leader of Lebanon's Progressive Socialist Party.

History 
It is also an ancient archaeological site, excavated in 1963 by Jacques Cauvin who found an abundance of flint tools. Examinations were conducted on 378 artifacts with finds including daggers, arrowheads, sickles, axes, chisels, picks and awls traced to the Neolithic horizon. James Mellaart suggested that Heavy Neolithic tools and weapons found at the site were "not associated with pottery, and possibly earlier than the Pottery Neolithic of Byblos."

Literature 

 Cauvin, J., "The Neolithic Moukhtara (South Lebanon)," L'Anthropologie, 67, 1963, p. 489-511. (1963)
 Cauvin, J. et Cauvin, M.-C., Des ateliers campigniens au Liban, in Mélanges R. Vaufrey, La préhistoire, problèmes et tendances. Paris, Éditions du CNRS, p. 103-116. (1968)

Footnotes

External links
 Moukhtara,  Localiban

Populated places in Chouf District
Druze communities in Lebanon
Neolithic settlements
Archaeological sites in Lebanon